The Lodgepole Complex Fire in Montana  was the state's and the nation's largest fire of the 2017 wildfire season as of early September, 2017. It burned on public and private land 52 miles WNW of Jordan and was caused by lightning on July 19. A mix of grassland and pine forest was involved. Sixteen homes and 16 unidentified structures were destroyed, and firefighting efforts cost over six million dollars.

References

2017 Montana wildfires